Pietro Borghese (also called Pietro della Francesca; 1398–1484) was an Italian painter of the early Renaissance period. He is described as being born in Borgo San Sepolcro, painting battle-scenes, and influencing Melozzo da Forlì. This may in fact be a painter confused with Piero della Francesca.

References

1398 births
1484 deaths
14th-century Italian painters
Italian male painters
15th-century Italian painters
Renaissance painters